Results from the 1997 Buenos Aires Grand Prix held at Buenos Aires on September 14, 1997, in the Autódromo Oscar Alfredo Gálvez.  The F1 autoracing series first returned to the Argentina track in 1995, after having been absent from the schedule for fourteen years.  The F1 drivers would race at this venue for four more years, including the 1997 event, before being dropped again from the schedule after the 1998 season.

Classification

References 

Buenos Aires Grand Prix
1997 in motorsport
1997 in Argentine motorsport
September 1997 sports events in South America